Sèvremoine is a commune in the Maine-et-Loire department of western France. Saint-Macaire-en-Mauges is the municipal seat.

History 
It was established on 15 December 2015 and consists of the former communes of Le Longeron, Montfaucon-Montigné, La Renaudière, Roussay, Saint-André-de-la-Marche, Saint-Crespin-sur-Moine, Saint-Germain-sur-Moine, Saint-Macaire-en-Mauges, Tillières and Torfou.

Population

See also 
Communes of the Maine-et-Loire department

References 

Communes of Maine-et-Loire
States and territories established in 2015